West Humboldt may refer to:
West Humboldt, California
West Humboldt Range, mountain range in Nevada